Union Station is a St. Louis MetroLink station. It is partially located underneath historic St. Louis Union Station and primarily serves the Downtown West area, including CITYPARK Stadium and the St. Louis Aquarium. The station is located below 18th Street at its intersection with Clark Avenue near the St. Louis Post Office and utilizes the former baggage tunnel at Union Station.

In 2013, Metro's Arts in Transit program commissioned the work Spring Forth by Jim Gallucci for installation near the station. The stainless steel sculpture depicts fantastical plant forms that leap and arch from the grassy embankment, celebrating the vitality that the MetroLink system brings to the St. Louis area.

Station layout
The platform is accessed via an elevator and staircase on the west end from the Union Station train shed and a staircase on the embankment on the east end.

References

External links
 St. Louis Metro
 Clark Avenue entrance from Google Maps Street View

MetroLink stations in St. Louis
Red Line (St. Louis MetroLink)
Blue Line (St. Louis MetroLink)
Railway stations in the United States opened in 1993